is a Japanese football player who plays for Hokkaido Tokachi Sky Earth.

Career
After being in youth ranks of Mito HollyHock, Nakagawa was promoted to the top team in 2017. On 14 June 2019, Nakagawa joined Albirex Niigata in Singapore.

Club statistics
Updated to end of 2018 season.

References

External links

Profile at J. League

1998 births
Living people
People from Yachiyo, Chiba
Hannan University alumni
Association football people from Chiba Prefecture
Japanese footballers
Japanese expatriate footballers
J2 League players
Singapore Premier League players
Mito HollyHock players
Albirex Niigata Singapore FC players
Hokkaido Tokachi Sky Earth players
Association football midfielders
Japanese expatriate sportspeople in Singapore
Expatriate footballers in Singapore